Johnson Branch is a stream in Clark County in the U.S. state of Missouri. It is a tributary of the Fox River.

Johnson Branch has the name of James Johnson.

See also
List of rivers of Missouri

References

Rivers of Clark County, Missouri
Rivers of Missouri